Sollner-Wall House is a national historic site located at 1759 Chaires Cross Road, Tallahassee, Florida in Leon County.

It was added to the National Register of Historic Places on October 9, 2012.

References

National Register of Historic Places in Tallahassee, Florida